The Iran Futsal's 2nd Division (Persian: ليگ دسته دوم فوتسال ایران) is the Third-highest division overall in the Iranian futsal league system after the 1st Division.

League Champions 

 2007: Saveh Shen - Melli Haffari
 2008: Naft Ahvaz - Bonyad Maskan
 2009: Gaz Khuzestan - Romatism
 2010: Naft Omidiyeh - Misagh
 2011: Foolad Mahan Novin - Houman Saz jonoub
 2012: Bargh shiraz - Afzon Pelast
 2013: Ali Sadr - Moghavemat Alborz
 2014: Azarakhsh
 2015: Arash Novin Iranian
 2016: Naft Omidiyeh
 2017: Ahoora - Sakapakhsh
 2018: Iralco - Khales Sazan
 2019: Foolad Sirjan - Polymer
 2020: Sobhan Felez
 2021: Al Ghadir
 2022:

See also 
 Iranian Futsal Super League
 Iran Futsal's 1st Division
 IPL
 Azadegan League
 Iran Football's 2nd Division
 Iran Football's 3rd Division
 Iranian Super Cup
 Hazfi Cup

External links 
  I.R. Iran Football Federation

Iran Futsal's 2nd Division
Futsal leagues in Iran
Professional sports leagues in Iran